Keepers: Greatest Hits is the first greatest hits compilation released by American country music artist Tracy Byrd. It was released in February 1999 as his last album for MCA, and it contains the previously unreleased track "When Mama Ain't Happy", which was issued as a single.

This compilation also features the radio edit of "The Keeper of the Stars", recorded a semitone lower than Byrd's original recording from his 1994 album No Ordinary Man.

Track listing

Personnel on track 1
Tracy Byrd- lead vocals
Larry Byrom- electric guitar
Owen Hale- drums, percussion
Aubrey Haynie- fiddle
John Barlow Jarvis- piano
Michael Rhodes- bass guitar
John Wesley Ryles- background vocals
Randy Scruggs- acoustic guitar
Robby Turner- steel guitar
Curtis Young- background vocals

Charts

Weekly charts

Year-end charts

References

1999 greatest hits albums
Tracy Byrd albums
MCA Records compilation albums